John Angus Dunning  (6 February 1903 – 24 June 1971) was a New Zealand cricketer who played in four Test matches between 1933 and 1937 and 60 first-class matches from 1923 to 1938. He later became a headmaster in Australia.

Academic and teaching career
Jack Dunning was born at Omaha and educated at Auckland Grammar School and Auckland University College, later graduating MSc (Honours) in Mathematics at the University of Otago. He was New Zealand's Rhodes Scholar in 1925 and, studying at New College, Oxford, he obtained his MA in Mathematics.

He taught at John McGlashan College, Dunedin, from 1923 to 1925 and from 1927 to 1939; he was also sports master. He was recruited to the headmastership of Scots College, Warwick, in Queensland from 1939 to 1949 and Prince Alfred College, Adelaide, from 1949 to 1969, where he was said to exhibit "Scottish carefulness". He was awarded the OBE in the 1965 New Year Honours.

Dunning died at Adelaide in South Australia in 1971. Obituaries were published in the New Zealand Cricket Annual in 1971 and in Wisden the following year.

References

External links

1903 births
1971 deaths
Alumni of New College, Oxford
Auckland cricketers
New Zealand cricketers
New Zealand educators
New Zealand Members of the Order of the British Empire
New Zealand Rhodes Scholars
New Zealand Test cricketers
Otago cricketers
Oxford University cricketers
People educated at Auckland Grammar School
South Island cricketers
Sportspeople from the Auckland Region
University of Otago alumni